James Monte Stanton (born October 29, 1946) was sixth bishop of the Episcopal Diocese of Dallas, serving from 1993 to 2014.

Early life and education
Stanton was born on October 29, 1946, in Atchison, Kansas. He was initially raised near St. Joseph, Missouri but in 1952 his family moved to southern California where he grew up and was educated. He studied at Chapman University and then sought ordination in the Disciples of Christ. Consequently he attended Lexington Theological Seminary to pursue theological studies. He transferred to Claremont School of Theology, where he graduated with a Doctor of Ministry in 1975. He also joined the Episcopal Church in 1975 and furthered his studies in the Episcopal ministry at the Church Divinity School of the Pacific between 1976 and 1977.

Ordained ministry
Stanton was ordained deacon by the Bishop of Los Angeles Robert C. Rusack in June 1977, and then priest in October 1977 by the Bishop of San Joaquin Victor Rivera. He served as curate at the Church of St Martin-in-Fields in Los Angeles between 1976 and 1977 and then as vicar of St Stephen's Mission in Stockton, California, between 1977 and 1981. In 1982, he became rector of St Luke's Church in Cedar Falls, Iowa, where he remained until 1987. He returned to California in 1987 to serve as the rector of St Mark's Church in Glendale, California.

Bishop
Towards the end of 1992, Stanton was elected the 6th Bishop of Dallas, and was consecrated bishop on March 6, 1993, at the Morton H. Meyerson Symphony Center by Presiding Bishop John Allin. During his episcopacy, he managed the diocese through the changes undertaken within the Episcopal Church and successfully maintained unity within the diocese. He retired on May 31, 2014. He married Diane Louise Hanson in December 1968 and together had two children.

References

Living people
1946 births
American Episcopalians
Episcopal bishops of Dallas
Chapman University alumni